Emami Group is an Indian multinational conglomerate company headquartered in Kolkata, India. This group trades with their tag name Himani. The company has seven manufacturing units across India and one overseas unit. The Company caters to a number of niche categories in the personal care and healthcare segments. 

The company's products are sold across 60+ nations and are available in 4.5 million retail outlets across India. Their most famous product is an antiseptic cream named Boro Plus which is widely used worldwide. The skin care deperment of company generated an overall revenue of  2,655 crores in the financial year 2019–20 with an annual profit of 639 crores. The total group revenue of the company stands at ₹20,000 crores.

History
The inception of Emami Group took place way back in mid-seventies, in West Bengal, when two childhood friends, Mr. R.S. Agarwal and Mr. R.S. Goenka left their high-profile corporate jobs with the Birla Group to set up Kemco Chemicals, a cosmetic manufacturing unit in Kolkata, in 1974. Emami believes in the philosophy "Making people healthy and beautiful naturally".  The company reported significant growth in modern trade and e-commerce revenues during the COVID-19 pandemic. It also re-launched Navratna Cool Talc and Zandu Pancharishta with improved formulation, packaging and communication. Emami Ltd. has also forayed into the hand sanitizer category as the demand for hand sanitizers has shot up in the last few weeks due to the coronavirus crisis.

Products
The company's power Brands include Navratna, BoroPlus, Zandu, Mentho Plus, Kesh King, Fair and Handsome. The company is well known in India for its fairness cream products for men.

Emami's brands:

In 2008, Emami acquired Zandu Pharmaceutical for ₹730 crores. The company merged Zandu FMCG into Emami and raised 310 crores through QIP. The company became debt free within 2 years of the Zandu deal. The company's health products unit offers tonics for colds and coughs as well as nutraceuticals.

It forayed into men's deodorant market by launching HE brand of deodorants. Hrithik Roshan was appointed as brand ambassador for HE brand. The company acquired Splash Corporation for 200 crore. A German personal care brand Creme 21 has been acquired by Emami for 100 crores in Feb 2019. In March 2022, Emami acquired the Dermicool brand from the UK-headquartered company, Reckitt for Rs 4.32 billion (£43 million).

Shareholding pattern

Controversies

Fair and Handsome
In 2007, the company attracted controversy with an advertisement for its skin whitening cream for men, Fair and Handsome. Emami and the star of the campaign, Shahrukh Khan, were accused of perpetuating racism.

In July 2013, WOW a Chennai-based NGO launched a campaign against Emami asking them to remove the Fair and Handsome advertisement starring Khan, saying that it is discriminating against people on the basis of skin color. The campaign has been supported by celebrities like Nandita Das Tannishta Chatterjee. More than 22,000 people have signed an online petition launched by them.

Hospital fire
In the early morning of 9 December 2011, an AMRI Hospital in south Kolkata's Dhakuria district erupted in fire, leading to the deaths of 92 people – mostly critically ill patients, many of them suffocating in their sleep. The following day, the license for the hospital was canceled, and the Chief Minister of West Bengal ordered a judicial inquiry into the incident. Allegedly, the fire was triggered by flammable chemicals that were stored at the site. Rescue efforts were hampered by the narrowness and congestion of the road leading to the hospital, and the allegations that all of the windows and doors were locked and that the fire alarms and sprinklers installed at the hospital did not work during the fire.

Seven members of the hospital's board were arrested the same day, and were remanded to police custody until 20 December by the court of the Chief Judicial Magistrate in Alipore.  Among the seven arrested were Agarwal and Goenka, founders of Emami and directors of the hospital chain, who were charged with negligently causing the deaths. Ultimately a total of 16 people stood accused in the courts in July 2016, including the board members and several directors of the hospital. Amongst the charges were culpable homicide not amounting to murder under section 304 of the Indian Penal Code, which carries a maximum sentence of 10 years' imprisonment in cases where the criminal actions are undertaken knowingly but without the intention to cause death. Additional charges were laid under Section 308 (attempt to commit culpable homicide) and Section 38 (effect caused partly by act and partly by omission).

The fire was recorded as the largest hospital tragedy in India at the time.

Sporting affiliation
 East Bengal Club of Indian Super League (2022–present)

References

External links

Companies based in Kolkata
Conglomerate companies established in 1974
Cosmetics companies of India
Companies listed on the National Stock Exchange of India
1974 establishments in West Bengal
Ayurvedic companies